Neoerythromma is a genus of damselflies in the family Coenagrionidae. There are at least 2 described species in Neoerythromma.

Species
 Neoerythromma cultellatum (Hagen in Selys, 1876) (Caribbean yellowface)
 Neoerythromma gladiolatum Williamson and Williamson, 1930

References

Further reading

 
 

Coenagrionidae